John Lucas (by 1512 – 13 September 1556), of Inner Temple, London, and Colchester, Essex, was an English Member of Parliament.

He was a younger son of Thomas Lucas of Little Saxham Hall, Suffolk and entered the Inner Temple in July 1526 to study law.

He was a Justice of the Peace for Essex from 1538 until his death and Town Clerk of Colchester from 1543 to 1548 and from 1550 to his death.  He was elected a Member of Parliament (MP) for Colchester in 1545, 1547 and 1553. He was a Master of Requests from 1552 to 1553.

He married twice: firstly Mary, the daughter of John Abell of Essex, who delivered him 2 sons and secondly Elizabeth, the daughter of John Christmas of Colchester, who delivered 1 son and 2 daughters. He was succeeded by his eldest son Thomas.

References

1556 deaths
Politicians from London
Members of the Inner Temple
People from Colchester
English MPs 1545–1547
English MPs 1547–1552
English MPs 1553 (Edward VI)
English MPs 1553 (Mary I)
Year of birth uncertain